Unstoppable may refer to:

Film and television
 Unstoppable (2004 film), an American film directed by David Carson
 Unstoppable: Conversation with Melvin Van Peebles, Gordon Parks, and Ossie Davis, a 2005 American television documentary film
 Unstoppable (2010 film), an American film directed by Tony Scott
 Unstoppable (2013 film), a documentary about Kirk Cameron, directed by Darren Doane
 Unstoppable (2018 film), a South Korean film directed by Kim Min-ho
 Unstoppable. Sean Scully & The Art of Everything, a 2019 British television documentary film
 Unstoppable (TV series), a 2020 Netflix show
 Unstoppable (talk show), an Indian Telugu-language web show
 UFC 64: Unstoppable, a 2006 mixed martial arts pay-per-view event

Literature
 Unstoppable (Nader book), a 2014 non-fiction political book by Ralph Nader
 Unstoppable (Nye book), a 2015 non-fiction science book by Bill Nye
 Unstoppable (Zook book), a 2007 non-fiction business book by Chris Zook
 Unstoppable (One Piece), a chapter of the manga series One Piece
 Unstoppable (39 Clues), the third series in the young-adult novel series The 39 Clues
 Unstoppable!, the first arc of the first volume of the Marvel Comics series The Unstoppable Wasp
 Unstoppable, a biography of Siggi B. Wilzig by Joshua M. Greene

Music

Albums
 Unstoppable (Aaliyah album), 2022
 Unstoppable (Amii Stewart album) or the title song, 1999
 Unstoppable (DeLon album) or the title song, 2008
 Unstoppable (Girl Talk album), 2004
 Unstoppable (Karol G album), 2017
 Unstoppable (The Oak Ridge Boys album), 1991
 Unstoppable (The Planet Smashers album), 2005
 Unstoppable (Rascal Flatts album) or the title song (see below), 2009
 Unstoppable (soundtrack), from the 2010 film (see above)
 The Unstoppable (2008) and The Unstoppable International Edition (2010), by 2face Idibia
 Unstoppable, by Amara La Negra, 2019
 Unstoppable, by the Planet Smashers, 2005
 Unstoppable, by Where Fear and Weapons Meet, 2001
 Unstoppable, an EP by the Score, or the title song, 2016

Songs
 "Unstoppable" (Kat DeLuna song), 2009
 "Unstoppable" (Lianne La Havas song), 2015
 "Unstoppable" (Ola song), 2010
 "Unstoppable" (Rascal Flatts song), 2010
 "Unstoppable" (Sia song), 2016
 "Unstoppable", by AJ Mitchell
 "Unstoppable", by the Calling from Camino Palmero, 2001
 "Unstoppable", by China Anne McClain from the A.N.T. Farm film soundtrack
 "Unstoppable", by E.S. Posthumus from Makara
 "Unstoppable", by Foxy Shazam from Foxy Shazam
 "Unstoppable", by NEFFEX
 "Unstoppable", by R3hab from Pepsi Beats of the Beautiful Game
 "Unstoppable", by Santogold from Santogold
 "Unstoppable", by Taylor Dayne from Naked Without You, 1998
 "Unstoppable", by TobyMac from Eye on It

See also
 Downy Unstopables In-Wash Scent Booster
 Irresistible (disambiguation)